Infinite Disco is a livestream concert by Australian singer-songwriter Kylie Minogue, held in support of her fifteenth studio album Disco (2020). It was broadcast on two dates in 2020 and was a joint-venture production by Driift and BMG Rights Management.

The livestream was announced on 19 October 2020, and a clip of Minogue singing "Magic" was released the same day. The concert was broadcast on 7 November 2020 and again on 31 December 2020 for New Year's Eve. Each broadcast was streamed four times both days to accommodate different time zones.

On 12 November 2021, the show was released on CD, DVD, and Blu-ray as part of the Guest List Edition of Disco. An LP version followed on 6 May 2022.

Background and development
Following the release of the singles "Say Something" and "Magic", Minogue announced a livestream performance of songs from her album Disco to be broadcast on 7 November 2020, one day after the album's released. Tickets went on sale on 21 October 2020.

The fifty-minute pre-recorded performance was co-directed by Rob Sinclair and Kate Moross. It primarily showcased songs from Disco but also included singles from earlier in Minogue's career that were remixed to have a more disco sound by her longtime contributors Richard Stannard and Steve Anderson. The performance was choreographed by Ashley Wallen. 

On 1 November 2020, Minogue uploaded her performance of "Say Something" from Infinite Disco to her YouTube channel. On 2 November 2020, Minogue shared a 30-second clip showcasing different parts of the performance, including portions of her singing her 2001 single "Love at First Sight" and "I Love It". On 6 November 2020, Minogue uploaded her performance of "Real Groove" from the show to her YouTube channel.

Nearly 30,000 tickets were sold for its initial broadcast.

Setlist
Source:
Introduction (contains excerpts from "Magic" and "Come into My World")
"I Love It"
"In Your Eyes"
"Light Years" / "Supernova" / "Light Years" (Reprise)
Interlude (contains excerpts from "I Should Be So Lucky")
"Dance Floor Darling" 
"All the Lovers" (performed with The House Gospel Choir)
"Say Something" (performed with The House Gospel Choir)
"Real Groove"
"Slow" (contains elements of "Love to Love You Baby")
"Monday Blues"
"Where Does the DJ Go?"
"Love at First Sight"
"Last Chance"
"Magic"

Infinite Disco live album

Infinite Disco is the ninth live album by Australian singer Kylie Minogue. On 12 November 2021, the "Guest List Edition" of Minogue's fifteenth studio album Disco was released. Included in the deluxe five-disc package was a recording of the Infinite Disco concert on CD, DVD, and Blu-ray. On 7 April 2022, Minogue took to her social media to announce the surprise release of  a standalone release of Infinite Disco on digital platforms the following day, with vinyls available for pre-order.

Track listing

Charts

Release history

Credits
Credits obtained from the viewing of East Coast USA livestream

Directors and producers
Director: Kate Moross and Rob Sinclair
Director of photography: Thomas English
Executive producer: Kylie Minogue, Polly Bhowmik, Tom Colboure and Rob Sinclair
Executive producer for Driift: Ric Salmon and Charlie Gatsky Sinclair
Executive producer for BMG: Alistar Nobury, Gemma Reilly-Hammond, and Jamie Nelson
Producer: Jim Parsons
Co-producer: Kristen Dickson-McFie

General staff
Personal assistant: Tully Bloom
HSE & COVID safety: Julian Bentley and Lukasz Mart
Catering: Lily Brown, Sherrie Fairman, and Shyrah-Jade Campbell

Costuming
Costume designer: Alexandre Vauthier
Costume stylist: Frank Strachan
Wardrobe: Ray Wooldridge, Philippa Howden, Tom Lawerence, and Alida Herbst 
Assistant stylist: Jessica Johnston
Hair and makeup: Christian Vermaak and Chang Il-Kim
Additional hair & makeup: Sandra O'Brien
Colorist: James Tonkin

Band
Musical director: Richard Stannard and Steve Anderson
Backing vocalists: Abbie Osmon and Katie Holmes-Smith
Choir master: Laura Leon
House Gospel Choir: Cartell Green-Brown, Laura Davie, Leanna Leid, Lizzie Jennings, Monique Meade, and Renee Alleyne
Choreographer: Ashley Wallen
Dance captain: Jenny Griffin
Dancers: Philip Birchall, Yves Cueni, Shaun Niles, Kamila Zalewska, Alex Chambers, Jake Leigh, Katie Collins, Ben Hulkin, and Elise Pinel

Sound
Audio mixer: Duck Blackwell
Sound: Gavin Tempany, Andrew Hamwee, and Jonny Buck

Production
Production design: Sinclair/Wilkinson
Production design associate: Luke Rolls
Production manager: Michael George
Racks engineer: Harry Watkinson
Records engineer: David Roberts
Script supervisor: Emily Aldous
CT project manager: Jim Liddiard
Event production: Lauren Sass, Stephen Reeve, Kevin Hopgood, Bree Ishikawa, Stuart Quinnell and Dave Farrell (Pull the Pin Out)

Video
Video design: Kate Moross, Linus Kraemer, and Dexter George
Motion design: Santiago Avila, Linus Kraemer, Dexter George, and Stephen McLaughlin
Video content: Studio Moross
Video content project manager: Bellen Morrison
Video programmer: Jack Banks
Video floor technician: Taras Bunt and Daniel Bovenkamp
Editing: Rupa Rathod, Hamish Lyons, Sam Thompsett
Additional editing: Kevin Ramser
Online editing: Richard Cullen
Visual effects: Kate Moross, Linus Kraemer, and Chris Kim
DIT: Alex Hewett

Lighting
Lighting design: Rob Sinclair and Ali Pike
Lighting: Benjamin Cash, Andy Porter, Davide Palumbi, Jason Hyne, Jon Shelley-Smith, Michelle Parker and Peter Horne
Laser design: Seth Griffiths
Laser technician: Joe Jackson and Josh Hughes

Cameras
Multicam director: Blue Leach
Camera operator: Simon Kennedy and Mark Stevenson
Camera guarantee: Tom Robinson
JIB operator: Marcus Leon Soon
JIB assistant: Ben Reason
Focus puller: Warren Buckingham

Miscellaneous
Filmed at LH3 Studios, London
Lighting supplied by NEG Earth Lights (Sam Ridgeway)
Lasers and SFX by ER Productions (Marc Webber)
Broadcast equipment and LED screens by Creative Technologies (Graham Miller)
Grip supplied by Luna Remote Systems
Cameras supplied by Procam TV
JIB supplied by Deve Emery
Film lighting supplied by Pro Light
Filters supplied by Panavision
DRIIFT is represented by Ric Salmon, Charlie Gatsky Sinclair, Phil Middleton, Pauline Macocco, Justine Young, Emma Stoker, Claire Mas, and Mich Bradfield

References

2020 concerts
Kylie Minogue concert tours
2020 in Australian music
Live albums recorded in London
2022 live albums
Kylie Minogue live albums
BMG Rights Management albums
Livestreams